Mirəşelli (also, Mirəşəlli, Mirashali, Mirasheli, and Mirashelli) is a village in the Agdam Rayon of Azerbaijan.  The village forms part of the municipality of Əhmədağalı.

References 

Populated places in Aghdam District